6B or 6b or VI-B may refer to :
 Keratin 6B, a type II cytokeratin
 Oflag VI-B, a World War II German POW camp for officers located  SW of the small town Dössel 
 REL-6B Radar, a ground air surveillance and guidance radar
 Rumpler 6B, a 1916 German single-engine floatplane fighter
 Season 6B, a popular fan theory related to the long-running British science fiction television series Doctor Who
 Stalag VI-B, a Nazi World War II camp for prisoners of war
 TUIfly Nordic IATA airline designator
 British Rail Class 203 Diesel-electric Multiple Units, which were classed as 6B (6 coaches, Buffet) pre-TOPS
 "6B" (Fringe), an episode of the television series Fringe
 6b/8b encoding, six-bit codes in telecommunications
 Supermarine S.6B, a British racing seaplane
 HAT-P-6b, a transiting extrasolar planet
 Northrop Grumman EA-6B Prowler, an American, twinjet all-weather attack aircraft
6B, the production code for the 1982 Doctor Who serial Earthshock

See also
B6 (disambiguation)